Philippe Huppé (born 12 February 1968) is a French politician of La République En Marche! who served as member of the French National Assembly from 2017 to 2022, representing the department of Hérault.

Huppé is a history teacher and author, having written several books, such as The Most Beautiful Legends of Occitania - The Herault of the Legends.

He lost his seat in the first round of the 2022 French legislative election.

References

1968 births
Living people
Deputies of the 15th National Assembly of the French Fifth Republic
La République En Marche! politicians
People from Mazamet
Politicians from Occitania (administrative region)